Allen Gilchrist (born 23 November 1931) is a Canadian former freestyle swimmer. He competed at the 1948 Summer Olympics and the 1952 Summer Olympics. He is the older brother of Sandy Gilchrist.

References

External links
 

1931 births
Living people
Canadian male freestyle swimmers
Olympic swimmers of Canada
Swimmers at the 1948 Summer Olympics
Swimmers at the 1952 Summer Olympics
Place of birth missing (living people)
Swimmers at the 1950 British Empire Games
Swimmers at the 1954 British Empire and Commonwealth Games
Commonwealth Games medallists in swimming
Commonwealth Games silver medallists for Canada
Swimmers at the 1955 Pan American Games
Pan American Games bronze medalists for Canada
Pan American Games medalists in swimming
Medalists at the 1955 Pan American Games
Medallists at the 1950 British Empire Games
Medallists at the 1954 British Empire and Commonwealth Games